The Hotel National Taichung is a hotel in West District, Taichung, Taiwan. It is Taichung's first five-star hotel, founded in 1980, the central one of the famous hotel, located in Chungkang Road, the tight Pro with Luyuan Road, National Museum of Natural Science and SOGO Department Store. Currently Qin Mei Group acquisition.

National Hotel have 306 rooms, five Chinese and Western restaurants and Banquet venues, and 400 plane parking spaces.

See also
 Grand Hotel (Taipei)

References

1980 establishments in Taiwan
Hotels established in 1980
Hotels in Taichung